Gary Parcell was an Australian professional rugby league footballer who played in the 1950s and 1960s. A Queensland interstate and Australia international representative forward, he played his club football in Ipswich for Brothers.

The son of Queensland Maroons forward, Percy Parcell, Gary, like his father, played for the Ipswich Rugby League's Brothers club.

In 1959, Queensland won the interstate series against New South Wales 3-1, but managed only seven players in a Kangaroo touring party of 26. They were Parcell Elton Rasmussen, Jim Paterson, Dud Beattie, Noel Kelly, Barry Muir and Ron Boden, with Boden originally from NSW.
http://www.couriermail.com.au/sport/nrl/darren-lockyer-to-overtake-clive-churchill-on-four-nations-tour/story-e6frepbf-1225766580774

In 1959 Parcell was first selected for the Australian national team, becoming Kangaroo No. 356.

Parcell is the grandfather of current Leeds Rhinos player Matt Parcell.

References

1933 births
2020 deaths
Rugby league players from Queensland
Australia national rugby league team players
Queensland rugby league team players
Australian rugby league players